The Erchong Floodway is a major flood control channel of the Tamsui River in New Taipei, Taiwan.

Description
Located on the left bank of the Tamsui River in New Taipei, the floodway passes through the districts of Sanchong, Xinzhuang, Wugu, and Luzhou.

In addition to its importance in flood control measures, the Erchong Floodway provides significant recreation and conservation functions. A network of urban parks, trails, greenspace, and leisure facilities within the floodway includes the New Taipei Metropolitan Park, Shuhongzhuifeng Park, and Shuhong Ecological Park among others. Wugu Wetland, at the mouth of the floodway on the Tamsui River opposite the mouth the Keelung River, is an important ecological wetland for bird species within the greater Taipei area.

History
The Taipei Basin is historically prone to flooding being located in a humid subtropical climate that can often experience catastrophic typhoons.  A number of rivers enter the Taipei Basin, including the Dahan, Xindian, and Keelung, that converge to form the Tamsui River.  The Tamsui acts as the sole hydrological outlet of the basin as it drains freshwater north to the Taiwan Strait, but the river is at a low elevation near sea level and is therefore subject to reverse saltwater flow at high tides several times a month.

After Typhoon Gloria caused significant flooding in Taipei in 1963, the Taiwan government carried out an engineering project to widen the Tamsui River at its narrowest point at Lion's Head Rock, near the present-day Guandu Bridge.  The effect of this project was counter-productive as the Tamsui River was exposed to more flooding from ocean high tides.

The idea of a freshwater floodway was first proposed in 1973 as part of Taipei District Flood Control Plan Proposal, but construction did not commence until 1979.  The first phase was completed in 1984, creating an alternate freshwater channel for the Tamsui River on its left bank at times of high water level.  The village of Zhouzaiwei was relocated to what is now Luzhou District as part of the first phase.  A second phase, completed in 1987, increased the heights of the embankment dikes to account for 200-year flood levels.  A third and final phase of the project was completed in 1996.

Gallery

See also
New Danube, Austria
Red River Floodway, Canada
Jakarta Flood Canal, Indonesia

References

Flood control projects